This is a list of members of the 2nd Legislative Assembly of Queensland from 1863 to 1867, as elected at the 1863 colonial elections held between 30 May 1863 and 27 June 1863 (due to problems of distance and communications, it was not possible to hold the elections on a single day).

See also
Premier:
 Robert Herbert (1859–February 1866)
 Arthur Macalister (February–July 1866)
 Robert Herbert (July–August 1866)
 Arthur Macalister (August 1866–August 1867)

Notes

 On 15 September 1863, upon a successful petition by Robert Cribb on the basis that printed lines on the ballot paper misled voters, the election in East Moreton was declared void. The election was re-run on 26 September, and William Brookes lost his seat to Cribb, whilst George Edmondstone retained his.
 On 8 February 1864, Charles Royds, the member for Leichhardt, resigned. His brother Edmund Royds won the resulting by-election on 14 April 1864.
 On 8 April 1864, George Raff, member for Town of Brisbane, resigned. William Brookes won the resulting by-election on 22 April 1864.
 On 28 July 1864, William Kennedy, the member for Maranoa, was unseated by the Elections and Qualifications Committee. William Miles won the resulting by-election on 27 September 1864.
 On 2 October 1864, Thomas DeLacy Moffat, member for Western Downs, died. John Watts won the resulting by-election on 2 November 1864.
 Under the Additional Members Act 1864, the seats of Clermont, Kennedy, Maryborough, Mitchell, Rockhampton and Warrego were created. By-elections to fill the new seats were held on 1 February 1865 (Maryborough and Rockhampton), on 18 March 1865 (Clermont and Kennedy) and on 25 March 1865 (Mitchell and Warrego).
 On 15 April 1865, John Edwards, the member for Burnett, resigned. Charles Haly won the resulting by-election on 13 May 1865.
 On 25 November 1865, Charles Blakeney, member for Town of Brisbane, resigned. George Raff won the resulting by-election on 25 November 1865.
 On 1 January 1866, John Gore Jones, the member for Mitchell, resigned. Theodore Harden won the resulting by-election on 22 February 1866.
 On 1 February 1866, John Douglas, the member for Port Curtis, was appointed as a minister. As such, he was required to resign and contest a ministerial by-election for his own seat. On 19 March 1866, he lost the by-election to Arthur Hunter Palmer.
 On 21 July 1866, the member for Ipswich Ratcliffe Pring was appointed Attorney-General of Queensland by Premier Robert Herbert. As such, he was required to resign and contest a ministerial by-election for his own seat. On 4 August 1866, he lost the seat to George McCullagh Reed.
 On 7 August 1866, the Premier of Queensland and member for West Moreton, Robert Herbert, resigned. Joseph Fleming won the resulting by-election on 11 September 1866.
 On 18 August 1866, Sydney Davis, the member for Clermont, resigned. Roderick Travers won the resulting by-election on 11 September 1866; however, he declined to take the seat and resigned on 12 October. A further by-election on 13 November 1866 was won by George Forbes.
 On 22 November 1866, Theodore Harden, the member for Mitchell, resigned. Edward Lamb won the resulting by-election on 4 January 1867.
 On 16 December 1866, John Donald McLean, the member for Eastern Downs, died. No by-election was held due to the proximity of the 1867 elections.

References

 Waterson, Duncan Bruce: Biographical Register of the Queensland Parliament 1860–1929 (second edition), Sydney 2001.
 Alphabetical Register of Members (Queensland Parliament)

Members of Queensland parliaments by term
19th-century Australian politicians